This list of motorways in the United Kingdom is a complete list of motorways in the United Kingdom. Note that the numbering scheme used for Great Britain does not include roads in Northern Ireland, which are allocated numbers on an ad hoc basis.

Great Britain

M-designated motorways

Upgraded A-road designations

Former motorways

Roads which used to be motorways but have been downgraded:

Motorways that have been renumbered

Motorways under construction or planned

The Adwick-le-Street to M62 stretch of the A1 is under consideration for upgrade to motorway standard, meaning the A1 between Blyth, south of Doncaster, to Birtley near Gateshead, would all be part of the same A1(M) stretch of motorway.

In addition, the proposal to put a tunnel under the River Thames to the east of Dartford Crossing and the revived Birmingham Western Orbital plans are both described as motorways.

Unbuilt motorways
There have been many plans for motorways in the UK that have not been built. Below is a list of plans that were not built (not exhaustive):
 M1 Sterling Corner Link, linking Sterling Corner to the M1.
 M12 in 3 forms (although a small part was built and is not used - a stub sliproad):
 From the London end of the M11 to Brentwood;
 From the London end of the M11 to Maplin Sands Airport (also not built);
 From the M25 (in the vicinity of the M11) to Chelmsford.
 M13, from East London to Maplin Sands airport passing south of Southend.
 M17 Castle Donington bypass, a short spur off the M1;
 M19, M1 to A1 in Yorkshire. Functionally equivalent to the M62 between junction 29 and 32A, but located further to the north, and without the eastern extension to Hull.
 M30, a proposed renumbering of the M3 once it was extended from Basingstoke to Southampton, but it never happened and the route remains the M3.
 M31, a bypass of the busiest section of the M25, cutting the corner for traffic from the west. Partially built as the A329(M) and A3290.
 M56-M62 Link, from the M56 to the M62, cutting the corner in Cheshire. Cancelled in 1993.
 M58 Mid-Lancashire Motorway, from west of Wigan to west of Bolton and the M61; cancelled in 1969. In the mid-1970s the M58 was reinstated, but as a two-lane dual carriageway and was cancelled again in 1986. In 1989, it was re-instated a second time, but was rerouted to end at the A58 instead of the M61 in 1993 and cancelled yet again in 1996. Wigan MBC picked up the M58 in the late 1990s, but only the western end was dual carriageway and the rest was downgraded to single carriageway. In 2007 the M58 was cancelled for good.
 M59, M58 J2 to south of Preston. Gradually trimmed back and eventually cancelled, partially due to widening of the M6.
 M60, a bypass of Altrincham and Sale, running from the M56 to Manchester. One section built as the A6144(M), and the section between M6 and M56 was built as an all-purpose dual carriageway bypass of the A556.
 M62 Relief Road, intended to relieve traffic on the existing M62, running alongside the M62 to the north and west of Salford and Manchester. Cancelled in 1995.
 M64, between the M6 south of Stoke-on-Trent and the M1 near Derby. Cancelled in 1976 to save costs, but the central section was built as an upgrade of the A50.
 M81, proposed number for the Maryhill Motorway and Trossachs Motorway, bypassing the A81 between Central Glasgow and Milngavie.
 M82, proposed number for the North Link Motorway and Lomond Motorway.
 M83, proposed number for the South Link Motorway and East Link Motorway, providing a south bypass of Glasgow via Rutherglen.
 M100, number reserved by the Department for Transport for a completed A1(M) between London and Tyneside.
 M111 (or M110), number reserved for the rump section of the M1 if the route was extended west to the A1. Because the M1 was extended east, the renumbering never happened.
 M272 Portswood Link, initially cancelled in the mid-1970s, but was reinstated in the 1980s as M27. Built as the A335 in 1989.
 M601, which would have entered Manchester from the M62 (now the M60) in the Irwell Valley at Clifton near Pendlebury.
 M650 Aire Valley Motorway, from near Silsden to Shipley. Cancelled in 1975; the A650 was built instead.
 A2(M) Dover Radial Route, which would have run between Ringway 1 and Ringway 2. Built as the A2 Rochester Way Relief Road in 1988.
 A6(M), bypassing Stockport to the west.
 A6(M) (or M66 extension), which would have formed an eastern bypass for Stockport. As of March 2006, this is still under the planning stage as part of the SEMMMS (south east Manchester multi modal study) project (though not as motorway).
 A11(M), original number for the M11.
 A14(M), number for the planned upgrade of the A14 between Cambridge and Huntingdon. The proposal was dropped in 2019 to allow the road to be opened sooner, and it opened as the A14.
 A34(M), a motorway standard bypass of Handforth, Wilmslow and Alderley Edge. The route later opened as non-motorway A34 bypasses.
 A48(M) Llantrisant Radial, branching off the A48 and running west out of Cardiff towards M4 J33. Cancelled in 1971 in favor of construction of the M4 north of Cardiff.
 A59(M) Ormskirk Bypass, planned bypass of Ormskirk, Burscough and Rufford. Became part of the planned M59 in 1963.
 A61(M) Sheffield Urban Motorway Link
 A556(M), which would have cut the corner between the M6 and M56 near Warrington. Completed in 2017 as an all-purpose dual carriageway bypass of the A556.
 A695(M) Shields Road Motorway, running from the A167(M) to A187 in Newcastle-upon-Tyne, cancelled in 1975. Later partially built as a bypass of the A193.
 Central Motorway West, running from New Redheugh Bridge to Town Moor Interchange, cancelled in 1975. One section completed as the B1318 and another section became a surface-level road.
 Chippenham Spur, off the M4
 Strensham – Solihull motorway, a link between the M50 and M42.  In the earliest stages of planning, a route that would have linked it with the M69 was considered.
 Most of the M67 – from Hattersley to the M1 via the Hope Valley in the Peak District national park and Sheffield. Various routes have been proposed but have yet to come to fruition due to controversy and/or expense. In 2014, the then Sheffield Hallam MP and Deputy Prime Minister, Nick Clegg signalled his support for improvements to the Woodhead Pass.
Western Orbital Motorway - M6 north of M54/M6 junction to M5 near Bromsgrove. Planned to relieve congestion in the West Midlands, this would have diverted traffic heading north west to south west away from the heavily congested M6 south of Walsall. A spur was planned to link to the A449 north of Wombourne. This proposal has been around since construction of the M42 started. The idea hasn't been completely abandoned but is more likely to be built as an all-purpose road rather than a motorway. 

Many cities had urban motorway plans, most of which were not built. London, Newcastle, Liverpool, Manchester/SELNEC and Glasgow all had extensive plans.

It was proposed that the A14 upgrade between Huntingdon and Cambridge would be classified as a motorway once complete, however prior to opening it was announced that the road would open as a "best in class A road" instead.

Northern Ireland

M-designated motorways

Upgraded A-road designations

Unbuilt motorways
The following motorways were planned, but never built.
 M11, from the M1 going through Lisburn and then crossing the M1 again and ending at Newry
 M23, from the M2 to Derry

There were also urban motorway plans for Belfast

See also
List of numbered roads in the British Isles
Motorways in the Republic of Ireland
List of controlled-access highway systems
Evolution of motorway construction in European nations

Notes

 
 
Motorways